This is a list of the equipment used by the Cuban Revolutionary Armed Forces.

Small arms

Vehicles

Light and medium tanks

Main battle tanks

Reconnaissance armoured vehicles

Infantry fighting vehicles

Armoured personnel carriers

Artillery

Towed artillery

Self-propelled artillery

Multi rocket launchers

Mortars

Anti-tank weapons

Anti-aircraft guns

SAMs

Self-propelled SAMs

References 

Military equipment of Cuba
Cuba